Nightly News may refer to:

NBC Nightly News in the United States
InfoWars Nightly News with Alex Jones in the United States
CNN Philippines Nightly News in the Philippines
ITV Nightly News in the United Kingdom
The Nightly News, a six-issue American comic book limited series.
Nightly News (CCTV) in China